Trisulam is a 1982 Indian Telugu-language drama film directed by K. Raghavendra Rao in screenplay written by Satyanand. The film stars Krishnam Raju and Sridevi.
Jayasudha, Raadhika, Prabhakar Reddy, Gollapudi Maruti Rao and Rao Gopal Rao are featured in supporting roles. The music was composed by K. V. Mahadevan. The songs "Pellante Pandillu" and "Raayini Aadadi Chesina" were chartbusters. The film was based on the novel Jagriti. It was remade in Hindi as Naya Kadam (1984).

Cast
Krishnam Raju as Ramu and Harish as Young Ramu
Sridevi as Lakshmi
Jayasudha as Neeli
Raadhika as Yadi
Prabhakar Reddy
Gollapudi Maruti Rao as Hitler Raghavaiah
Rao Gopal Rao as Pentaiah
Allu Rama Lingaiah as Lingam
Chalapathi Rao as Bhadraiah
Tulasi
Rajya Lakshmi

Soundtrack 
Soundtrack was composed by K. V. Mahadevan. All Lyrics penned by Aathreya
Veluguku Udhayam - (P Suseela, S P Baalasubrahmanyam)
Pellante Pandhillu - (P Suseela, S P Baalasubrahmanyam)
Raayini Aadadhi Chesina Raamudivaa - (P Suseela, P Baalasubrahmanyam)
Anukoledammaa Ilaa Avuthundani - (P Suseela, S P Baalasubrahmanyam)
Athade Vachchi (Padyam) - (S P Baalasubrahmanyam)
Suprabhaatham Suprabhaatham - (P Suseela, S P Baalasubrahmanyam)
Pannendellaku Pushkaraalu - (P Suseela, S P Baalasubrahmanyam)

References

External links 
 

1982 films
1980s Telugu-language films
Indian drama films
Films directed by K. Raghavendra Rao
Films produced by Krishnam Raju
Films scored by K. V. Mahadevan
Films about the education system in India
Films based on Indian novels
Telugu films remade in other languages
1982 drama films